Poloxamer 407 is a hydrophilic non-ionic surfactant of the more general class of copolymers known as poloxamers. Poloxamer 407 is a triblock copolymer consisting of a central hydrophobic block of polypropylene glycol flanked by two hydrophilic blocks of polyethylene glycol (PEG). The approximate lengths of the two PEG blocks is 101 repeat units, while the approximate length of the propylene glycol block is 56 repeat units. This particular compound is also known by the BASF trade name Pluronic F-127 or by the Croda trade name Synperonic PE/F 127. BASF also offers a pharmaceutical grade, under trade name Kolliphor P 407.

Uses
Most of the common uses of poloxamer 407 are related to its surfactant properties. For example, it is widely used in cosmetics for dissolving oily ingredients in water. It can also be found in multi-purpose contact lens cleaning solutions, where its purpose there is to help remove lipid films from the lens. It can also be found in some mouthwashes. There is research ongoing for using poloxamer 407 for aligning severed blood vessels before gluing them surgically. Poloxamer 407 can also be used for its thermogelling properties in aqueous media. 

Poloxamer 407 is approved by the FDA for use as an excipient in a range of pharmaceutical dosage forms, and is listed in the Inactive Ingredient Database (IID).

Poloxamer 407 is used in bioprinting applications due to its unique phase-change properties. This allows poloxamer 407 to serve as a removable support material, particularly for creating hollow channels or cavities inside hydrogels. In this role, it is often referred to as a "sacrificial ink" or a "fugitive ink".

Reports of adverse effects
It was reported in The Australian newspaper 18 November 2006 that this common ingredient in toothpaste and mouthwash can cause high cholesterol in mice. A team from the Centre for Ageing and the ANZAC Research Institute in Sydney used it as a tool to demonstrate that cells in the liver behave like a sieve. They gave a high dose (1 gram per kilogram of body weight) of poloxamer 407 to mice, which blocked 80% of the pores in liver cells that absorb lipoproteins, leading to a 10-fold increase in plasma lipid levels. However, the dose used is far higher than a person would be exposed to in toothpaste or mouthwash.

Potential degradation by sonication 
Wang et al. reported that aqueous solutions of poloxamer 188 and poloxamer 407 sonicated in the presence or absence of multi-walled carbon nanotubes (MWNTs) can become highly toxic to cultured cells. The toxicity correlated with the sonolytic degradation of the polymers.

References

External links
ChemSub Online: Poloxamer 407
BASF Pharma Solutions: Poloxamers
www.croda.com/healthcare/poloxamers

Non-ionic surfactants